Memnon was a king of Ehtiopia in Greek mythology.

Memnon may also refer to:

Given name
 Memnon of Rhodes (380–333 BC), commander of the Greek mercenaries working for the Persian King Darius III
 Memnon of Thrace, Macedonian governor of Thrace who led a rebellion in 332 BC - see Antipater
 Memnon of Heraclea, 1st or 2nd century Greek historian
 Saint Memnon the Wonderworker, 2nd century Christian saint from Egypt, hermit and hegumen of one of Egyptian monasteries
 Memnon, ward of Herodes Atticus in Athens in the 2nd century AD
 Saint Memnon the Centurion, martyred c. 305 - see August 23 (Eastern Orthodox liturgics)
 Memnon of Ephesus, a fifth century bishop of Ephesus who took part in the Nestorian controversy

Ships
Memnon (clipper), the first clipper ship to reach San Francisco during the Gold Rush
SS Memnon, a cargo ship sunk by a U-boat on 11 March 1941

Other uses
 Memnon (horse), early 19th century British Thoroughbred racehorse
 Memnon (novel) by Scott Oden, based on Memnon of Rhodes
 Memnon, the main villain in the film The Scorpion King
 2895 Memnon, an asteroid

See also
 Colossi of Memnon, two statues of Pharaoh Amenhotep III near modern-day Luxor
 Younger Memnon, one of two colossal statues of Ramesses II from the Ramesseum at Thebes, Egypt